Ernie or Ernest Bond may refer to:
Ernie Bond (bushman) (1891–1962), Tasmanian bushman who lived at Gordonvale
Ernest Ernie Bond (footballer) (born 1929), English footballer
Ernest Ernie Bond (politician) (1897–1984), Australian politician
Ernest Radcliffe Bond (1919–2003), British police officer and soldier